Kharkhoda is a city and municipal committee in Sonipat district in the Indian state of Haryana and is a part of National Capital Region (NCR) of Delhi. In Kharkhoda Chhapadeshwar Mahadev Mandir is very popular within the connected villages. At the time of Maha Shivratri festival a large number of tourists comes for visiting the temple.
Due to the proximity of UT of Delhi, there is a lot of scope of industrial and residential development in the area.
Haryana State Industrial and Infrastructure Development Corporation acquired 3200 Acres of land to develop Industrial Model Township (IMT). Western Peripheral Expressway (KMP) is just 1 km & Delhi–Amritsar–Katra Expressway is 5 km away from the city.
On 28 August 2022 Shri Narendra Modi laid foundation stone of Maruti Suzuki's new manufacturing plant in Kharkhoda. Khanda village of Kharkhoda block have a statue of Baba Banda Singh Bahadur (one of the great military commander of India) which was inaugurated by CM of Haryana Manohar Lal Khattar on Shaurya Diwas celebrated in Khanda, Sonipat.

Here Mughal emperor, Aurangzeb constructed a Mosque, which is now ruined. In Pre Partition days, Kharkhoda was the town of Muslim Sayyid Families, which are also called Mir. In 1947 they migrated to Pakistan. Famous Pakistani writer and researcher, Syed Qasim Mahmood, was born here.

Geography
It has an average elevation of 207 metres (682 feet).

Demography
As of 2001 India census, Kharkhoda had a population of 18,758. As a Tehsil it contain 45 villages.  Tehsil had population of 160083 in villages. Males constitute 53% of the population and females 47%. Kharkhoda has an average literacy rate of 89%, higher than the national average of 59.5%: male literacy is 71%, and female literacy is 56%.  In Kharkhoda, 16% of the population is under 6 years of age. Its current population is about 21,302. Kharkhoda Land can be made subdivision  after ongoing census of India. The most common language spoken in Kharkhoda is Haryanvi. Khanda is very big & historical village in Kharkhoda.

It said to derive its name from Kharak, meaning a stall. Another tradition connects it with Khara and Dushana, the brothers of Ravana, the rakshasa king of Lanka (now Sri Lanka).

It is located 16 miles to the west from a nearby city, Rohtak. Total distance between Kharkhoda to Sonipat is 19 km . It has an elected municipal body to run the municipal administration of the town, which also contains the headquarters of the tehsil of Kharkhoda. In this historical site, there is a  tomb of Syed  Sufi Saint and his fair held annually. Also, there is a mandir that is very famous for Parwan Ji Maharaj, a spiritual guru.

The town nurses a number of places of public utility of which a college, a civil veterinary hospital, a civil dispensary, a head post office, and a police station are worth mentioning. It has an important grain market situated at Khanda Bypass.

Very soon Kharkhoda town is going to become Industrial Model Town. Also a new Civil Hospital is constructed at Thana Kalan Road.
Also, the new roads are under construction up to the newly constructed bypass all over the town, earlier it doesn't connect Rohtak road and Sonipat road but after the construction of this part of bypass now it covers all the town. ITI has been constructed on a Bypass.

IMT Kharkhoda

IMT Kharkhoda is located on Delhi Haryana border adjacent to KMP Expressway (Kundli Manesar Palwal). Due to its proximity with Delhi and direct connectivity with Bahadurgarh, Gurgaon and Sonipat via KMP Expressway, Kharkhoda Industrial Area will have a great potential in future for industrial development in Haryana. Upcoming Haryana Orbital Rail Corridor will also provide seamless rail connectivity to IMT Kharkhoda with nearby Industrial areas in Delhi NCR. Kharkhoda Industrial Area spreads across approx. 3217 acres and development is going to be start soon. Out of total 4348 industrial plots in Kharkhoda, 2965 plots are for general category and 1383 plots under R & R category. Plot sizes in IMT Kharkhoda start from 450 Sqm and going up to 4 acres. Industrial Model Township, Kharkhoda will be a well planned having Industrial Plots, Commercial Plots, Institutional & Housing Areas.

Maruti Suzuki is setting up Asia's biggest manufacturing plant in IMT Kharkhoda across 900 acres with an investment of 18000 crore.

Maruti Suzuki

On 28 August 2022 Prime Minister of India Shri Narendra Modi lays foundation stone of Maruti Suzuki's new manufacturing plant in Kharkhoda. It will be the largest automobile manufacturing plant in Asia with capacity of making 15 lac cars per year.
Government of Haryana gives 900acres of HSIIDC land to Maruti Suzuki for setting up a new manufacturing plant in Kharkhoda.

See also
 Khanda, Sonipat
 Sisana, Sonipat
 Battle of Sonipat

References

Cities and towns in Sonipat district